Michael Paul Sullivan After serving in the United States Air Force, he went on to become a test pilot for NASA at Cape Canaveral. Sullivan is credited with the ECLIPS Experimental Cloud Lidar Pilot Study, which was initiated to obtain statistics on cloud-base height, extinction, optical depth, cloud brokenness, and surface fluxes.

External links
The Experimental Cloud Lidar Pilot Study (ECLIPS) for cloud-radiation research

1970 births
Living people
American test pilots
Place of birth missing (living people)
Date of birth missing (living people)